Members of the New South Wales Legislative Council who served from 1885 to 1887 were appointed for life by the Governor on the advice of the Premier. This list includes members between the elections commencing on 16 October 1885 and the elections commencing on 4 February 1887. The President was Sir John Hay.

See also
Fifth Robertson ministry
Jennings ministry
Fourth Parkes ministry

Notes

References

 

Members of New South Wales parliaments by term
19th-century Australian politicians